Mud Spring, formerly called Aquaje Lodoso (muddy watering place), is a spring and historic site in the western Antelope Valley, within northern Los Angeles County, southern California.

History

El Camino Viejo
Aquaje Lodoso was an aguaje, a watering place on the Spanish and Mexican El Camino Viejo inland north–south route in colonial Alta California. It was located between Elizabeth Lake and Cow Spring water sources.  

It was also a watering place on the Old Tejon Pass road between the Antelope and San Joaquin Valleys in the 1840s and early 1850s until that road was replaced by the Stockton–Los Angeles Road, a  new and easier road through Fort Tejon Pass.

Stockton - Los Angeles Road
The Butterfield Overland Mail 1st Division had a station operating at Mud Springs, on the Stockton - Los Angeles Road.
In 1860, a correspondent of the Daily Alta California wrote an account of his travel by stagecoach to Los Angeles from San Francisco.  He mentions that the Butterfield Overland Mail (1857-1861) had a station operating at Mud Springs in 1860.

See also
Butterfield Overland Mail in California

References 

Antelope Valley
Springs of California
Former settlements in Los Angeles County, California
El Camino Viejo
Butterfield Overland Mail in California
Stagecoach stops in the United States